Roberto Andrade Silva or simply Roberto (born April 24, 1988) is a Brazilian defensive midfielder who currently plays for Esporte Clube São Bento.

Career 
Made professional debut in Campeonato Brasileiro with a 6–3 away win against Figueirense on May 12, 2007 as 62nd-minute substitute for Alan Bahia.

References

Honours
South American Championship (U 15): 2003
South American Championship (U 17): 2005
South American Championship (U 20): 2007

Contract
1 February 2009 to 1 February 2010

External links
 CBF
 sambafoot.com
 furacao.com
 rubronegro.net
 atleticopr.com
 zerozero.pt

1988 births
Living people
Brazilian footballers
Campeonato Brasileiro Série A players
Guarani FC players
Club Athletico Paranaense players
Avaí FC players
Grêmio Barueri Futebol players
Sociedade Esportiva e Recreativa Caxias do Sul players
Cuiabá Esporte Clube players
Palmas Futebol e Regatas players
Brazil youth international footballers
Brazil under-20 international footballers
Association football midfielders